The Stephen D. Lee House in Columbus, Mississippi, was built in 1847 by Thomas Garton Blewett.  It was listed on the National Register of Historic Places in 1971 and declared a Mississippi Landmark in 1985.  It was the home of Confederate Lt. Gen. Stephen D. Lee.

The house is open for tours on Fridays and features the Florence McLeod Hazard Museum with exhibits on local and regional history, and items dating between 1833 and 1908, the years covering Confederate Gen. Stephen D. Lee’s life.

References

External links
 Stephen D. Lee House and Museum - official site

Georgian architecture in Mississippi
Greek Revival houses in Mississippi
Houses completed in 1847
Houses on the National Register of Historic Places in Mississippi
Columbus, Mississippi
Houses in Lowndes County, Mississippi
Museums in Lowndes County, Mississippi
Historic house museums in Mississippi
Mississippi Landmarks
1847 establishments in Mississippi
National Register of Historic Places in Lowndes County, Mississippi